The discography of Michel Teló, a Brazilian country music recording artist, consists of one studio albums, two live albums, eight singles, one video albums, and nine music videos.

Albums

Studio albums

Live albums

Singles

International singles

Featured in

Brazilian singles

Featured in

Telenovela Theme songs

References

Discographies of Brazilian artists
Latin music discographies